The Komarpanth (or Komarpant naik or Comorpaica) are a social group centred in and around Karwar Goa, komarpants used to primarily speak their own language, known as Halegannada (Old Kannada) alongwith Marathi and Konkani.

History
The Komarpanths are originally from the Keladi Keladi Nayaka Kingdom or the Vijayanagar Empire, from the royal family of Karnataka or the old Mysore State, and are the followers of Shri Shringeri Mata” founded by Jagadguru Shri Shankaracharya at Shringeri.

The Rulers of Keladi had extended their kingdom up to Goa State and the Keladi Nayaka Kingdom was under the control of the Vijayanagara Kingdom.

Komarpanths are also referred to as those from the “Payaka” family which means that they are from the “superior leader” or the troop leaders. They were known for horsemanship, archery and soldiering. They have fought several times with the Sultans of Mysore and also against the British rule in India.

Early modern period

Komarpanth Veera Henje Naik, born in 1736, fought against the British and the Sulthans of Mysore. With the help of the Bhandaris of Kodibag on the banks of the Kali River at Karwar, and fellow Komarpanths, Veera Henje Naik had been controlling the Five Islands that covered the entrance to Karwar from the sea route. But as the British outnumbered him with their army summoned from Madras, his team was ambushed by the British at Kodibag, and Veera Henje Naik was shot by the British in the year 1801. His samadhi (tomb) still remains in Kodibag.

During the period from 1736–1801, Komarpanth Veera Henje Naik ruled the province of Goa and some parts of Karwar and Uttara Kannada District and determined to fight against the British and the Sulthans of Mysore. Owing to his charismatic leadership, he was conferred upon with the title Chak Mak Jenga in 1794A.D.  Komarpanth Veera, Henje Naik by King Sadashivanayaka of Keladi Nayaka Kingdom. The monuments installed by the Komarpanths still remain in the islands of Anju Div Island, Kurumgad Islands, Guddehalli and Belur, Shirave hills.

Komarpanths have settled in villages spread across Goa State, and in Karnataka in Uttara Kannada district Karwar, Sirsi, Dandeli, Ankola, Joida, Yellapur, Haliyal and even up to Kumta Taluk.

References

 ‘Keḷadi polity’ By K.N. Chitnis, 1974, Research Publication Series, Volume 17, Karnataka University, Dharwar
 ‘Keladi Dynasty’, By Naraharayya S.N., 1930, Quarterly Journal of the Mythic Society, Volumes 21 and 22.
 ‘Studies in Keladi history: Seminar Papers’ Edited by Giri S. Dikshit, 1981, Mythic Society, Bangalore.
 ‘Shivatatva ratnakara of Keladi Basavaraja: A Cultural Study’ By Radha Krishnamurthy, 1995, Keladi Museum and Historical Research Bureau
 ‘The Nayakas of Ikkeri’ By K.D. Swaminathan, 1957.

Social groups of India